The "Town Musicians of Bremen" is a German fairy tale collected by the Brothers Grimm and published in Grimms' Fairy Tales in 1819 (KHM 27).

It tells the story of four aging domestic animals, who after a lifetime of hard work are neglected and mistreated by their former masters. Eventually, they decide to run away and become town musicians in the city of Bremen. Contrary to the story's title the characters never arrive in Bremen, as they succeed in tricking and scaring off a band of robbers, capturing their spoils, and moving into their house. It is a story of Aarne–Thompson Type 130 ("Outcast animals find a new home").

Origin 
The Brothers Grimm first published this tale in the second edition of Kinder- und Hausmärchen in 1819, based on the account of the German storyteller Dorothea Viehmann (1755–1815).

Synopsis
In the story, a donkey, a dog, a cat, and a rooster, all past their prime years in life and usefulness on their respective farms, were soon to be discarded or mistreated by their masters. One by one, they leave their homes and set out together. They decide to go to Bremen, known for its freedom, to live without owners and become musicians there ("Something better than death we can find anywhere").

On the way to Bremen, they see a lighted cottage; they look inside and see three robbers enjoying their ill-gotten gains. Standing on each other's backs, they decide to scare the robbers away by making a din; the men run for their lives, not knowing what the strange sound is. The animals take possession of the house, eat a good meal, and settle in for the evening.

Later that night, the robbers return and send one of their members in to investigate. He sees the cat's eyes shining in the darkness and thinks he is seeing the coals of the fire. The robber reaches over to light his candle. Things happen in quick succession; the cat scratches his face with her claws, the dog bites him on the leg, the donkey kicks him with his hooves, and the rooster crows and chases him out the door. The terrified robber tells his companions that he was beset by a horrible witch who had scratched him with her long fingernails (the cat), a dwarf who has a knife (the dog), a black monster who had hit him with a club (the donkey), and worst of all, a judge calling out from the rooftop (the rooster). The robbers abandon the cottage to the strange creatures who have taken it, where the animals live happily for the rest of their days.

In the original version of this story, which dates from the twelfth century, the robbers are a bear, a lion, and a wolf, all animals featured in heraldic devices. When the donkey and his friends arrive in Bremen, the townsfolk applaud them for having rid the district of the terrible beasts. An alternate version involves the animals' master(s) being deprived of his livelihood (because the thieves stole his money and/or destroyed his farm or mill) and having to send his or their animals away, unable to take care of them any further. After the animals dispatch the thieves, they take the ill-gotten gains back to their master so he can rebuild. Other versions involve at least one wild, non-livestock animal, such as a lizard, helping the domestic animals out in dispatching the thieves.

Analysis

Tale type 
The tale is classified in the international Aarne-Thompson-Uther Index as type ATU 130, "The Animals in Night Quarters (Bremen Town Musicians)". Folklorists Stith Thompson and Barre Toelken see a deep relation between this type and type ATU 210, "Cock (Rooster), Hen, Duck, Pin, and Needle on a Journey".<ref>Toelken, Barre. “The Icebergs of Folktale: Misconception, Misuse, Abuse”. In: Carol L. Birch and Melissa A. Heckler, eds. Who Says? – Essays on Pivotal Issues in Contemporary Storytelling. Little Rock, Arkansas: August House Publishers, 1996. p. 40.</ref>

Folklorist Antti Aarne proposed an Asian origin for the tale type ATU 130, "Die Tiere auf der Wanderschaft" ("Wandering Animals and Objects").Hoebel, E. Adamson. "The Asiatic Origin of a Myth of the Northwest Coast". In: The Journal of American Folklore 54, no. 211/212 (1941): 1-9. Accessed June 16, 2021. doi:10.2307/535797.

French folklorist Paul Delarue identified two forms of the tale type: a Western one, wherein the animals in exile are always domestic animals (represented by Grimm's tale), and an Eastern one, wherein the characters are "inferior animals". This second form is popular in Japan, China, Korea, Melanesia and Indonesia.

 Variants 

The story is similar to other AT-130 tales like the German/Swiss "The Robber and the Farm Animals", the Norwegian "The Sheep and the Pig Who Set Up House", the Finnish "The Animals and the Devil", the Flemish "The Choristers of St. Gudule", the Scottish "The Story of the White Pet", the English "The Bull, the Tup, the Cock, and the Steg", the Irish "Jack and His Comrades", the Spanish "Benibaire", the American "How Jack Went to Seek His Fortune" and "The Dog, the Cat, the Ass, and the Cock", and the South African "The World's Reward".

Joseph Jacobs also cited this as a parallel version of the Irish "Jack and His Comrades", and the English "How Jack went to seek his fortune". Variants also appears in American folktale collections, and in Scottish Traveller repertoires.

Variants also appear in tale compilations from Indian, Malay and Japanese sources.

Cultural legacy
The tale has been retold through animated pictures, motion pictures (often musicals), theatre plays and operas.

Screen and stage adaptations

 In 1935, Ub Iwerks created The Brementown Musicians which was an adaptation made for Iwerk’s series of ComiColor Cartoons.
 German-U.S. composer Richard Mohaupt created the opera Die Bremer Stadtmusikanten, which premiered in Bremen 1949.
 The tale was adapted in humorous fashion for the British children's series Wolves, Witches and Giants narrated by Spike Milligan, but with the action taking place in 'Brum' (short for Birmingham) rather than Bremen.
 In the Soviet Union, the story was loosely adapted into an animated musical in 1969 by Yuri Entin and Vasily Livanov at the studio Soyuzmultfilm, The Bremen Town Musicians. It was followed by a sequel called On the Trail of the Bremen Town Musicians. In 2000, a second sequel was made, called The New Bremen Town Musicians.
 In 1972, Jim Henson produced a version with his Muppets called The Muppet Musicians of Bremen, set in Louisiana instead of Bremen.
 In 1976, in Italy, Sergio Bardotti and Luis Enríquez Bacalov adapted the story into a musical play called I Musicanti, which two years later was translated into Portuguese by the Brazilian composer Chico Buarque. The musical play was called Os Saltimbancos, was later released as an album, and became one of the greatest classics for children in Brazil. This version was also made into a movie. 
In Spain, the story inspired the animated feature film titled, Los 4 músicos de Bremen in 1989, directed by Cruz Delgado, a cartoonist and animation filmmaker, this being his last film. After gaining fame and recognition by winning the Goya Award for Best Animated Film, the animated television series "Los Trotamúsicos", was aired with a total of 26 episodes. The synopsis follows the story of four animal friends: Koki the rooster, Lupo the dog, Burlón the cat and Tonto the donkey; who form a band in the playing respectively guitar, drums, trumpet and saxophone with the aim of winning a contest in the city of Bremen.
 In Japan, Tezuka Productions made a loose science fiction themed animated television film adaptation titled , which premiered in 1981. It revolves around an alien visiting Earth during a military invasion of a fictional Bremen and giving four animals based on the ones from the original tale a device that can transform them into humans. Despite being aimed at children, the film has a substantial amount of gun violence and depictions of war crimes, but its core theme is anti-war.
 In Germany and the United States, the story was adapted into an animated feature in 1997 under the title The Fearless Four (Die furchtlosen Vier), though it varied considerably from the source material; while the general plot is the same, the four arrive in Bremen and help to free it from the grasp of the corrupt corporation Mix Max, along with rescuing animals that the company plans to turn into sausage. It starred R&B singer James Ingram as Buster the dog, guitarist B.B. King as Fred the donkey, singer and pianist Oleta Adams as Gwendolyn the cat and Italian musician Zucchero Fornaciari as Tortellini the Rooster in the English dub. 
 The obscure 1997 Dingo Pictures film, Die Bremer Stadtmusikanten, is a mockbuster of the aforementioned The Fearless Four.
 On Cartoon Network in between cartoon breaks during the Out of Tune Toons marathon and on Cartoonetwork Video, there are cartoon shorts (called "Wedgies") of an animal garage band based on the tale called The Bremen Avenue Experience featuring a cat (Jessica), dog (Simon), donkey (Barret) and rooster (Tanner). They are either a modern adaptation of Town Musicians of Bremen or descendants of the old musicians of Bremen.
 The HBO Family animated series, Happily Ever After: Fairy Tales for Every Child, adapted this story in Season 3 and did a country/African-American twist on it featuring Jenifer Lewis as Hazel (the dog), Gladys Knight as Chocolate (the donkey), Dionne Warwick as Miss Kitty (the cat), and George Clinton as Scratchmo (the rooster).
 The 2020 Japanese tokusatsu series Kamen Rider Saber adopts the story as a "Wonder Ride Book" called , which is utilized by one of the protagonists, Kamen Rider Slash.

Literature

 Richard Scarry wrote an adaptation of the story in his book Richard Scarry's Animal Nursery Tales in 1975. In it, the donkey, dog, cat and rooster set out since they are bored with farming.
 In the Japanese adventure game Morenatsu, the dog character Kōya is part of a rock band with three other performers, who are a cat, a bird, and a horse. The protagonist makes note of the resemblance to the Town Musicians of Bremen, with a brief monologue explaining the fairy tale.
 In the comic Blacksad's fourth album, "A Silent Hell", a mystery unfolds in New Orleans around the remaining members of a defunct musical group formerly composed of a dog, a cat, a rooster, and a donkey, all of whom had migrated to the city from their home on a Southern island.
 In Black Clover, Nacht Faust is a host to four devils; Gimodelo, Plumede, Slotos and Walgner, a dog, a cat, a horse and rooster respectively.

Music
 In the early 20th century, the American folk/swing/children's musician Frank Luther popularized the musical tale as the Raggletaggletown Singers, presented in children's school music books and performed in children's plays.
 The Musicians of Bremen (1972), based on the Brothers Grimm fairy tale, the "Town Musicians of Bremen", for male voices: two countertenors, tenor, two baritones and bass; composed by Malcolm Williamson, and premiered by The King's Singers in Sydney on 15 May 1972.
 In 2012, American artists PigPen Theatre Co. released their debut album titled Bremen, with the fifth track "Bremen"'s lyrics telling the story of the Town Musicians of Bremen.
 In 2015, Japanese rock musician Kenshi Yonezu released his third album titled Bremen, with the sixth track "Will-O-Wisp"'s lyrics being centred on the Town Musicians of Bremen.

Art and sculpture

 Statues modeled after the Town Musicians of Bremen statue now reside in front of each of the five German veterinary schools. 
 Another replica of the statue can be found in the Lynden Sculpture Garden, located in Milwaukee.
 A persiflage of this tale can be found on the wall in the Fort Napoleon, Ostend, Belgium. Heinrich-Otto Pieper, a German soldier during World War I, painted the German and the Austro-Hungarian eagles throned on a rock, under the light of a Turkish crescent. They look with contempt on the futile efforts of the Town Musicians of Bremen to chase them away. These animals are symbols for the Allied Forces: on top the French cock, standing on the Japanese jackal, standing on the English bulldog, standing on the Russian bear. Italy is depicted as a twisting snake and Belgium a tricolored beetle.
 A sculpture in Riga shows the animals breaking through a wall (symbolising the Iron Curtain).
 A junction in Pune City of India has been named after Bremen as 'Bremen Chowk' and has sculpture of instrument that four musicians had used.
 The city of Fujikawaguchiko in Japan has its own statue of the Town Musicians of Bremen.
 The City of Kawasaki in Japan has a Bremen Street that features a replica statue.

Video games

In Super Tempo, the second stage is set in Bremen, and the player's goal is to find and reunite the ghosts of the four deceased Town Musicians—referred to as "The Bremens," akin to a band name—to perform a song.
In The Legend of Zelda: Majora's Mask, there is a musician playing a hurdy-gurdy who tells his story about how he was in a musical troupe run by animals. For listening to his tale, the player receives an item called the Bremen Mask (which allows the player to play a musical march on their ocarina, thus allowing the player to lead animals), which is a reference to the Town Musicians of Bremen.
In Agatha Knife, there is an in-game quiz where you are asked about the animals that make up the Town Musicians of Bremen, allowing you to go to the zoo for free.
In Super Robot Taisen OG Saga: Endless Frontier, the four members of the Orchestral Army are named Ezel, Katze, Henne, and Kyon—the German words for donkey, cat, and hen and the Greek word for dog, respectively. Their organization being called the Orchestral Army is a further reference to the story.
In The Witcher 3: Wild Hunt, the Town Musicians of Bremen appear as NPCs in the "Blood and Wine" DLC.
In Library of Ruina, there is a syndicate based on the Musicians of Bremen, with each of its original members representing a different animal from the story's cast.
Shari Lewis adapted the story in the computer game "Lamb Chop Loves Music," replacing the donkey with a horse and Lamb Chop taking the place of the rooster. After fleeing the robbers' den, other animals join the group as they try to become musicians in Bremen.

In The Sims 3, the item “An Accumulation of Animals” depicts the musicians of Bremen stacked on one another.

German Fairy Tale Route
The sculpture of the Town Musicians of Bremen in Bremen, Germany, is the starting point of a tourist attraction, the German Fairy Tale Route (Deutsche Märchenstraße).

See also

 Jack and His Comrades (Irish fairy tale collected by Joseph Jacobs)
 Ub Iwerks' ComiColor Cartoon The Bremen Town Musicians (1935 film)
 The Bremen Town Musicians 1969 (Soviet musical cartoon)
 The Four harmonious animals is a figure in Jātaka tales and other Buddhist mythology 

 Citations 

 General bibliography 
 Boggs, Ralph Steele. Index of Spanish folktales, classified according to Antti Aarne's "Types of the folktale". Chicago: University of Chicago. 1930. p. 33.
 Bolte, Johannes; Polívka, Jiri. Anmerkungen zu den Kinder- u. hausmärchen der brüder Grimm''. Erster Band (NR. 1-60). Germany, Leipzig: Dieterich'sche Verlagsbuchhandlung. 1913. pp. 237–259.
 "Children's Stories in Sculpture: Bremen Town Musicians in Bremen." The Elementary School Journal 64, no. 5 (1964): pp. 246-47. www.jstor.org/stable/999783.

External links

 
 Golden Books 1954 version
 Folktales of ATU type 130 by D. L. Ashliman

Some of the best known adaptations are:

  Disney 1922 animated version
  Russian animated version
  Brazilian musical free adaptation of the tale
  1989 Spanish animated movie version
  1997 German edition, also released in English under the title "The Fearless Four"
  The Muppet Musicians of Bremen
 The Disney version of The Four Musicians of Bremen at The Encyclopedia of Disney Animated Shorts
 Skulptures of the Musicians of Bremen, limited edition (German)

1819 short stories
Animal tales
Culture in Bremen (city)
Fictional cats
Fictional chickens
Fictional dogs
Fictional donkeys
German fairy tales
German folklore
Germany in fiction
Grimms' Fairy Tales
ATU 100-149